Marian Adámek (born 2 October 1997) is a Czech ice hockey defenceman. He is currently playing with HC Oceláři Třinec of the Czech Extraliga.

Adámek made his Czech Extraliga debut playing with HC Oceláři Třinec during the 2014–15 Czech Extraliga season.

Personal life
Adámek belongs to the Polish minority in the Czech Republic. He is a graduate of the Juliusz Słowacki Polish Gymnasium in Český Těšín.

References

External links

1997 births
Living people
Czech ice hockey defencemen
HC Oceláři Třinec players
Polish people from Zaolzie
HC Frýdek-Místek players
People from Český Těšín
Sportspeople from the Moravian-Silesian Region
Czech people of Polish descent